Biscomaun Bhawan is the  tallest building in Patna and Bihar. It is a public building that houses many of the administrative offices of Bihar. It is 71 meters high. It houses many important offices of the Bihar government, the Government of India, some private company offices, and the Nalanda Open University. It is the only building with a revolving restaurant (Pind Balluchi), and a software park in all of Bihar and Eastern India.

Important offices and businesses
 Centre for Development of Advanced Computing (C-DAC),Patna
 Director General of Foreign Trade
 Software Technology Parks of India, Patna
 Nalanda Open University
 IGNOU Bihar state centre (moved to Mithapur, Patna)
 Central Information Council of East Central Railway Zone
 Pind Balluchi Revolving Restaurant
 BMSICL ( Now shifted to Sheikhpura, Patna)
 Smart City Project
 District Transport Office
Bihar Rural Livelihoods Promotion Society (JEEViKA) (HQ)

References
BISCOMAUN Exam Result 2021

Skyscraper office buildings in India
Buildings and structures in Patna
1971 establishments in Bihar
Buildings and structures completed in 1971
20th-century architecture in India